Catedral Metropolitana, or Metropolitan Cathedral, can refer to several cathedrals including:

 Guadalajara Cathedral
 Mexico City Metropolitan Cathedral
 Rio de Janeiro Cathedral
 Catedral Metropolitana de La Paz
 Catedral Metropolitana de Quito
 Catedral Metropolitana de San Salvador
 Catedral Metropolitana de Santiago
 Catedral Metropolitana de Sucre

See also
Metropolitan cathedral (disambiguation)
Metropolitan bishop